Frederick Funk (born June 14, 1956) is an American professional golfer who plays on the PGA Tour and PGA Tour Champions.

Early life
Fred Funk was born in Takoma Park, Maryland. He tried several sports, and even boxed for eight years for a junior boys club. He played on the golf team at High Point High School in Beltsville, Maryland.

Funk went to the University of Maryland, College Park, but was cut from the golf team in 1975. He transferred to Prince George's Community College, then returned to UM two years later to earn a top spot with the Terrapins golf team. At the time he also held a job as a circulation supervisor for the Washington Star. He graduated from the University of Maryland in 1980 with a degree in law enforcement. He turned professional in 1981, but worked as a golf coach at UM from 1982 to 1988.

PGA Tour career
After also playing in a few PGA Tour event for several years beginning in 1982 but with little success, Funk finally became a member of the PGA Tour in 1989, playing in 29 official tournaments and several unofficial ones.
He earned his biggest paycheck to date with $12,500 in a tie for ninth in the Chattanooga Classic.

In 1990, he struggled with consistency, missing the cut in nearly half the tournaments he entered. However, there were some bright spots, including a T-3 to earn $34,800 in the Chattanooga Classic as well as a fifth-place finish in the Buick Open to pocket $40,000. In 1991 he had slightly more success, with top-10 finishes in five tournaments.

Funk broke through in 1992 with his most successful year to date, including his first PGA Tour win. In May, he captured the Shell Houston Open with a 16-under score for a two-stroke win over Kirk Triplett and winnings of $216,000.

In 1995, he won his second PGA Tour tournament with a score of 16-under at the 1995 Ideon Classic, for which he earned $180,000. He followed that up with a win just two months later at the Buick Challenge, with another 16-under for $180,000.

Funk was a member of the United States teams at the 2003 and 2005 Presidents Cup and the 2004 Ryder Cup. He received some criticism in 2004 for opting out of The Open Championship, one of the tour's four major tournaments, despite having qualified. He played instead in that week's B.C. Open, a much less prestigious event, but one which also offered Ryder Cup ranking points.

In 2005, Funk scored his biggest PGA Tour win when he captured The Players Championship, also becoming its oldest winner at 48 years, 9 months, 14 days by defeating Tom Lehman, Scott Verplank and Luke Donald by a stroke. He earned $1.44 million for the win.

Since turning 50 in June 2006, Funk has been eligible for Champions Tour events and debuted in the 2006 U.S. Senior Open. When he turned 50, he still featured in the top 50 of the Official World Golf Ranking.

He won a further PGA Tour tournament, his eighth career win, in 2007 after his senior debut, becoming only the second over-50 player to win on the PGA Tour in 31 years. That win came at the first Mayakoba Golf Classic at Riviera Maya-Cancun, an alternate event to the WGC-Accenture Match Play Championship, so none of the world's top 64 ranked players were in the field. By winning the Mayakoba Golf Classic, Funk became the first man to win a PGA Tour event held in Mexico and, at age 50 years, 8 months and 12 days, became the fifth-oldest champion in PGA Tour history and the oldest since Art Wall Jr. (51 years, 7 months, 10 days) at the 1975 Greater Milwaukee Open.

Funk is generally regarded as one of the shortest drivers on today's PGA Tour, but is always at or near the top of the driving accuracy statistics. In fact, many of his playing competitors are now regarding him as perhaps the straightest driver to ever play golf; in the past 14 years, Funk has achieved the highest driving accuracy on the PGA Tour seven times, and has been in the top five of this statistic for every year but one in that period.

On March 28, 2005, Funk picked up the biggest win of his career, becoming the oldest player ever to win The Players Championship. He also won the unofficial Skins Game tournament, during which, to satisfy a friendly bet, he wore a pink skirt that Annika Sörenstam pulled out of her golf bag when she outdrove Funk on the par-five third hole. The skirt was actually picked out by Funk's wife, Sharon.

In August 2008, Funk won his first senior major, the JELD-WEN Tradition.

After years of chronic knee pain, Funk underwent a total knee replacement in 2009. Later that year, on June 8, 2009, he became the oldest qualifier, at age 53, for the U.S. Open at Bethpage Black by shooting 139 over 36 holes at Woodmont Country Club in Rockville, Maryland, surviving a playoff.

In August 2009, Funk won his second major championship on the Champions Tour at the 2009 U.S. Senior Open at Crooked Stick Golf Club in Carmel, Indiana. Funk dominated the rest of the field and cruised to a six-stroke victory over Joey Sindelar.

With his third senior major victory at the 2010 Jeld-Wen Tradition, he became the first player to win a PGA Tour-sanctioned event after knee-replacement surgery.

A popular player on tour, his fans are referred to as "Funk's Punks." The iconic songs — Play That Funky Music and Give Up the Funk — have become theme songs for the fan favorite.

Funk has publicly endorsed a number of products including clubs, greens, and golf balls. He maintains professional relationships with Southwest Greens, TaylorMade for its clubs, Titleist golf balls, and Stryker Orthopaedics.

As of the 2013–14 season at age 57, Funk currently still plays in several PGA Tour events a year while devoting most of his time to the Champions Tour.

At the end of the 2013 season, Funk ranked 38th in career PGA Tour earnings with just over $21 million in earnings. He ranked 23rd in all-time Champions Tour earnings with over $9.1 million.

Personal life
Funk married his wife, Sharon (Archer), in 1994. They currently reside in Ponte Vedra Beach, Florida. They had a son, Taylor Christian, in 1995. He played golf for Ponte Vedra High School and won the Florida 2A state championship in October 2013 and later the University of Texas. Taylor turned professional in 2017. They have a daughter, Perri Leigh, born in 1999. Fred has a son, Eric Justin, born in 1991 during Fred's first marriage, which ended in 1992; Eric graduated from Virginia Tech in 2013.

Funk has been enshrined in both the University of Maryland Athletic Hall of Fame as well as the state of Maryland Athletic Hall of Fame.

Funk was erroneously featured as a correct answer in the 50th edition of the World's Largest Trivia Contest in 2019.

Professional wins (29)

PGA Tour wins (8)

*Note: The 1996 B.C. Open was shortened to 54 holes due to weather.

PGA Tour playoff record (2–3)

Other wins (12)
1977 Middle Atlantic PGA Championship
1978 Middle Atlantic PGA Championship
1979 Middle Atlantic PGA Championship
1983 Maryland Open
1984 Foot-Joy PGA Assistant Professional Championship
1987 Maryland Open, Middle Atlantic PGA Championship
1988 Middle Atlantic PGA Championship
1989 Middle Atlantic PGA Championship
1993 Mexican Open
2005 Merrill Lynch Skins Game (unofficial money event-PGA Tour), CVS Charity Classic (with Chris DiMarco)

PGA Tour Champions wins (9)

Champions Tour playoff record (0–3)

Results in major championships

WD = withdrew
CUT = missed the half-way cut
"T" indicates a tie for a place

Summary

Most consecutive cuts made – 5 (1993 U.S. Open – 1994 PGA)
Longest streak of top-10s – 1 (five times)

The Players Championship

Wins (1)

Results timeline

CUT = missed the halfway cut
"T" indicates a tie for a place.

Results in World Golf Championships

1Cancelled due to 9/11

QF, R16, R32, R64 = Round in which player lost in match play
"T" = Tied
NT = No tournament

Senior major championships

Wins (3)

Results timeline
Results not in chronological order before 2022.

CUT = missed the half-way cut
WD = withdrew
"T" indicates a tie for a place
NT = No tournament due to COVID-19 pandemic

U.S. national team appearances
Ryder Cup: 2004
Presidents Cup: 2003 (tie), 2005 (winners)
UBS Cup: 2002 (winners), 2004 (winners)
Wendy's 3-Tour Challenge (representing Champions Tour): 2007, 2008 (winners), 2009, 2012, 2013

See also
1988 PGA Tour Qualifying School graduates
1989 PGA Tour Qualifying School graduates
List of golfers with most PGA Tour wins

References

External links

American male golfers
Maryland Terrapins men's golfers
PGA Tour golfers
PGA Tour Champions golfers
Ryder Cup competitors for the United States
Winners of senior major golf championships
Golfers from Maryland
Golfers from Jacksonville, Florida
People from Takoma Park, Maryland
Sportspeople from Montgomery County, Maryland
1956 births
Living people